The 1987 World Badminton Grand Prix was the fifth edition of the World Badminton Grand Prix finals. It was held in Hong Kong, from January 6 to January 10, 1988.

Final results

References
Smash: World Grand Prix Finals, Hong Kong 1987

World Grand Prix
World Badminton Grand Prix
B
Badminton in Hong Kong